Section de recherches ("Investigation Unit") is a French television series first broadcast on TF1 on May 11, 2006.

In Belgium, the series was shown on La Une from November 9, 2013.

Plot
The Investigation Unit is a special unit of the National Gendarmerie, responsible for the most complex cases. In Bordeaux (from 2006 to 2013) and then in Nice (from 2014), it investigates child abductions, disappearances, and vicious or sexual crimes. In search of witnesses, the team is empowered to extend its investigations beyond the borders of France.

Development
Since the series was developed at the same time as another TF1 police show, "R.I.S, police scientifique", the production team made the two differ by portraying gendarmes outside of Paris, in Bordeaux, to present different scenery. The series has a deliberate focus on interpersonal relationships, inspired by American series such as "Cold Case" and "Without a Trace".

The show runner  Dominique Lancelot is both producer and screenwriter. The series is one of the few French productions to be written using the writing room process commonly employed by American TV shows: the writers work in two groups to produce two storylines at a time and meet several days a week to work together. One of the writers is then designated to write the step outline, and another to write the dialogue. Each storyline thus passes through several hands before receiving the approval of the show runner for the shoot. The series is therefore in continuous production, with each episode being shot as soon as it is finalised, a style quite rare for French series which are more typically filmed in whole seasons. Each episode has a budget of €900,000, plus a €100,000 fee payable to the Centre national du cinéma et de l'image animée (the National Centre for Cinema and the Moving Image), and therefore totals one million euros per episode.

In 2013, following the seventh season, the production team decided to make a number of changes to the show, including moving the police unit from Bordeaux to Nice. Both technical and creative factors were cited as prompting the changes: the writers wanted to develop the serial format of the show, with an increasing focus on the characters' personal lives; and the occasional inclement weather in the Gironde region had been creating difficulties in filming some of the show's many outdoor scenes. Production schedules benefitted from the milder climate and longer days in the Alpes-Maritimes.

The show was commissioned by TF1 for a tenth series to be broadcast in 2016, but underwent a major upheaval when producer Dominique Lancelot stepped down from her role as show runner  and was replaced by Marie Guilmineau (The Shadow Men). at the end of the ninth series.

Casting
In 2008, Linda Hardy joined the cast of the third season as Chief Warrant Officer Claire Linsky. She decides to leave at the end of next season series in 2010 to focus on his family.

In 2011, two new characters appeared in the fifth season: Warrant Officer Fanny Caradec played by Félicité Du Jeu and Officer Marc-Olivier Delcroix played by Vincent Primault.

The seventh season saw many casting changes. Félicité Du Jeu left the series due to pregnancy. Kamel Belghazi also left the series in mid-season. Manon Azem joined the show shortly after in the role of Warrant Officer Sarah Casanova.

In 2013, the relocation of the series from Bordeaux to Nice for the eighth season led to many changes in the cast: except for Xavier Deluc and Chrystelle Labaude and Manon Azem, all the other actors (Jean-Pascal Lacoste, Virginia Caliari and Olivia Lancelot) were written out. Additions included: Franck Sémonin in the role of Lieutenant Lucas Auriol and Julie Fournier in lieutenant Roxane Janin. Stéphane Soo Mongo also joined as Warrant Officer Alexandre Sainte-Rose and Félicité Chaton as Warrant Officer Victoire Cabral. Finally, Manon Azem returned to the cast in the fifth episode of the eighth season.

Cast

Episodes
For the first seven seasons the set was in Bordeaux and from season 8 onward the set is in Nice.

Shooting
The filming of the first six seasons takes place in Bordeaux and in the Aquitaine region for outdoor scenes and in Paris for indoor scenes.

The filming of episodes 67 and 68: from April 3 to April 20 in Angoulême and around, episodes 69 and 70: from May 22 for 3 weeks in Angoulême and surroundings, episodes 71 and 72: from June 18 for 3 weeks in Angoulême and surroundings and episodes 73 and 74: from September 3 for 3 weeks in Angoulême and the surrounding area.

The filming of the final of the fifth season in La Réunion lasted 24 days.

The shooting of the sixth season begins at the end of February 2011 for an expected duration of nine months.

The shooting of the seventh season is from April to December 2012.

Since the eighth season and the relocation of the series to Nice, production has set up its studios in a former perfumery factory in the Grasse (Alpes-Maritimes) zone. The shooting of the eighth season begins in April 2013 in region.

The filming of the ninth season begins March 24, 2014.

The shooting of the tenth season is planned in two stages: a first part from the end of March 2015, and a second part from the summer until the end of December 2015.

The filming of the eleventh season began in March 2016.

The shooting of the twelfth season began on March 13, 2017.

References

2006 French television series debuts
2000s French television series
2010s French television series
French police procedural television series